Jayden Hadler (born 23 September 1993) is an Australian competitive swimmer.  He represented Australia at the 2012 Summer Olympics in London, competing in the preliminary heats of the men's 100-metre butterfly and 200-metre individual medley. He now owns his own swimming club called "Southern Cross Swim Club".

References

External links
 

1993 births
Living people
Australian male butterfly swimmers
Australian male freestyle swimmers
Australian male medley swimmers
Sportsmen from Western Australia
Olympic swimmers of Australia
Swimmers at the 2012 Summer Olympics
Swimmers at the 2014 Commonwealth Games
Commonwealth Games gold medallists for Australia
Commonwealth Games silver medallists for Australia
Swimmers from Perth, Western Australia
World Aquatics Championships medalists in swimming
Commonwealth Games medallists in swimming
Universiade silver medalists for Australia
Universiade medalists in swimming
Medalists at the 2013 Summer Universiade
20th-century Australian people
21st-century Australian people
Medallists at the 2014 Commonwealth Games